Thomas Monahan may refer to:
 Thomas S. Monahan (born 1956), president and CEO of CIBC Mellon
 Thomas L. Monahan III, president and CEO of DeVry University

See also
 Thomas Monaghan (disambiguation)